Miquel "Miki" Núñez Pozo (born 6 January 1996) is a Spanish singer and television personality from Terrassa. He gained national recognition after placing sixth in series ten of the reality television talent competition Operación Triunfo. Núñez consequently represented Spain at the Eurovision Song Contest in 2019, with the song "La Venda". The singer would release two studio albums afterwards through Universal Music, Amuza (2019) and Iceberg (2020) to great commercial success.

Career

2018–2019: Operación Triunfo and Eurovision Song Contest

Before Operación Triunfo, Miki studied guitar and piano, as well as a degree in Primary education teaching. He also was a vocalist in cover band Dalton Bang, with whom he toured Catalonia performing. In 2018, Miki auditioned for the tenth series of Operación Triunfo, being one of the 18 contestants selected for the opening gala, and making it to the semi-finals en route to finishing in sixth place.

Miki was then one of the 13 Operación Triunfo contestants allocated songs for the show's side competition to choose Spain's entrant in the Eurovision Song Contest 2019. He was given a total of three songs: "Nadie se salva", a duet with Natalia Lacunza, and solo songs "El equilibrio" and "La venda". While "El equilibrio" failed to make the first cut, "Nadie se salva" and "La venda" advanced to the Eurovision Gala, making him and Lacunza the only contestants with more than one song to perform in the national final. On 20 January 2019, Miki received the 34% by audience vote and was selected to represent Spain in the Eurovision Song Contest 2019 with "La venda".

Miki was the last to perform at the Eurovision final, held on 18 May 2019 in Tel Aviv, Israel. He placed twenty-second out of the 26 participating countries with 54 points: 1 from the professional juries and 53 from the televote.

2019: Amuza
Núñez released a single titled "Celébrate" on 28 June 2019. The single preceded the release of his first studio album, titled Amuza, on 13 September 2019. It debuted at number one on the Spanish Albums Chart. The release of the album was followed by the same-titled tour in fourteen cities across Spain.

2020–present: Iceberg and television projects
On 8 May 2020, Núñez released a single titled "Me Vale". The song was included in his second studio album, titled Iceberg, that was released on 20 November 2020 and debuted at number four on the Spanish Albums Chart.

In October 2020, Núñez debuted as television presenter for the TV3 reality television music competition Cover. In 2022, he hosted another TV3 music talent show, Eufòria, alongside Marta Torné. Also in 2022, Telecinco announced Núñez as the host for the online casting of Got Talent España. In January and February 2023, Nuñez, alongside Aitor Albizua, hosted La Noche del Benidorm Fest, the side show of the television song contest Benidorm Fest 2023.

Discography

Albums

Singles

As featured artist

Promotional singles

Other charted songs

Filmography

Television

Awards and nominations

Los 40 Music Awards

References

1996 births
Living people
Eurovision Song Contest entrants of 2019
Eurovision Song Contest entrants for Spain
Operación Triunfo contestants
People from Terrassa
Singers from Barcelona
Folk-pop singers
21st-century Spanish singers
21st-century Spanish male singers
Música Global artists